Palaquium ravii is a species of tree in the family Sapotaceae. It is endemic to the Western Ghats mountains and native to Kerala and Tamil Nadu in India.

Description 

This species occurs as evergreen trees that grow up to 20 to 37 m tall. The trees have straight, smooth, grey bark or greyish-red boles, with reddish blaze and profuse white latex. Mature trees appear like columns as the branches spread out at a significant height. The young branchlets are cylindrical, with appressed small hairs, but are hairless when mature. The leaves are simple and alternate, spirally arranged and distinctly clustered towards the end of the twigs. The leaves are thick (coriaceous), hariless (glabrous), with an entire margin and turn brown when dry. They have small stipules that drop off, leaving a visible scar. The leaf petiole is about 1.5- 2.5 cm long and with small hairs when young, but is glabrous in mature leaves. The leaf blade is about 8-17 long and 3.5-6.2 cm wide, distinctly obovate to oblanceolate in shape. The leaf has an attenuate base and an apex that is obtuse or rounded or abruptly acuminate with a blunt tip. In venation, the leaves have 5-8 pairs of secondary nerves and broadly reticulate tertiary veins. The flowers are creamy white that are solitary in older branches or held in axillary clusters of 2-8 flowers each with a pedicel up to 1 cm long.  The fruit is a berry, with a spherical or obovoid shape, about 2 cm in length. The calyx lobes are persistent on the fruit, which has a grainy, rough light brown surface. The fruits have 1, or rarely 2, seeds, that are shiny, brown.

Taxonomy 
The species was described by N. Sasidharan and W. Vink and named after N. Ravi, Professor of Botany, in Sree Narayana College, Quilon. It differs from 11 other species in the same genus found in India and Sri Lanka is some key characters. It lacks an acumen at the leaf tip unlike Palaquium bourdillonii, P. canaliculatum, P. ellipticum, P. laevifolium, P. pauciflorum, P. petiolare, P. polyanthum, and P. thwaitesii. It has smaller leaves and fewer lateral nerves than P. grande and P. obovatum and a much shorter fruit stalk than in P. rubiginosum. The obovoid berry and leaf shape is somewhat similar to P. obovatum, but the latter lacks the arcuate connections between the secondary nerves and has its tertiary nerves transverse.

Common names 
The species is called Choppala, Pachendi, Pali in Malayalam. The Kadar name for it is Chora Pali.

Distribution and status 
The species is endemic to the Anamalai Hills of the southern Western Ghats mountain ranges in India. It is listed as Endangered in the IUCN Red List of Threatened Species.

Ecology 
The species occurs in medium-elevation tropical wet evergreen forests of the Western Ghats. It was reported to occur between 700 and 800 m elevation, but recent surveys have recorded the species between 670 and 100 m above sea level in the Anamalai Hills. The trees flower between April and June and fruits are seen between May and September.

Gallery

References

ravii
Flora of Kerala
Flora of Tamil Nadu
Endangered plants
Taxonomy articles created by Polbot